Events from the year 1741 in Ireland.

Incumbent
Monarch: George II

Events
January–April – Great Irish Famine (1740–1741) at its height.
June–August – hot summer. The harvest is improved, but disease encouraged.
2 October – the Bull's Head Musical Society opens a Music Hall in Fishamble Street, Dublin.
18 November – the composer George Frideric Handel arrives in Dublin to give a series of concerts.
Commencement of construction of obelisk and other works on Killiney Hill (overlooking Dublin Bay) by John Mapas to relieve poverty.
Completion of rebuilding of Powerscourt House in County Wicklow by the architect Richard Cassels.

Births
23 June – William Trench, 1st Earl of Clancarty, politician and statesman (died 1805).
4 October – Edmond Malone, Shakespeare scholar and literary critic (died 1812).
11 October – James Barry, painter (died 1806).
Approximate date – Bryan Higgins, chemist (died 1818)

Deaths
16 March – Thomas FitzMaurice, 1st Earl of Kerry, politician (born 1668).
John Ussher, soldier and politician (born 1682).

References

 
Years of the 18th century in Ireland
Ireland
1740s in Ireland